822 Naval Air Squadron was a Fleet Air Arm aircraft squadron before and during World War II.

History

Pre-war
822 squadron was formed on 3 April 1933 from a merger of No's 442 and 449 (Fleet Spotter Reconnaissance) Flights at Netheravon and posted to the Home Fleet aboard .  From March to November 1936 it was equipped with Fairey Seals passed on from 821 Squadron, soon replaced by Blackburn Sharks, to carry out a Torpedo Spotter Reconnaissance role. In August 1937 the squadron received Fairey Swordfish aircraft, which it continued to operate from Furious until February 1939, when the squadron was re-allocated to HMS Courageous as a deck landing training unit. Furious  and Courageous were 1st class cruisers which had been converted in 1924 to serve as an aircraft carriers. When Courageous was sunk by the German submarine U-29 in September 1939, the squadron was disbanded.

World War II
The squadron was re-formed in October 1941 as a torpedo bomber reconnaissance (TBR) Swordfish squadron.

On 11 November, the squadron attacked La Senia Airfield, losing Commanding Officer, Lieutenant JGA McI Nares.

After July 1943, it attached to 45th Naval TBR Wing and transferred to southern India in February 1944 for service with the Eastern Fleet.

In June 1945 the squadron was again re-equipped, this time with 12 Barracuda IIs.

Aircraft operated

References
Sqn Histories 712–825
Fleet Air Arm archive

800 series Fleet Air Arm squadrons
Military units and formations established in 1933